László Balogh (born January 12, 1930) is a Hungarian painter from Szentendre. Since 1956, his works have been shown both in Hungary and abroad, and his paintings can be found in private and public collections in Hungary, Germany, the United States, Switzerland, France, Austria, Sweden, Finland and Spain.

References
Hungarian Museums homepage

External links
László Balogh paintings

1930 births
Living people
Hungarian painters
People from Szentendre
Hungarian male painters